Radisson is an international upscale hotel and resort chain of Radisson Hotel Group.

Radisson may also refer to:

Places

Canada
 Radisson (electoral district), a provincial electoral division in Manitoba 
 Radisson, Quebec, a small village
 Radisson, Saskatchewan, a town
 Radisson Heights, Calgary, Alberta, a neighbourhood

United States
 Radisson, New York, a census-designated place
 Radisson (town), Wisconsin
 Radisson, Wisconsin, a village
 Radisson Lake, a lake in Minnesota

Other uses
 Radisson (Amtrak), a Chicago-Milwaukee train
 Radisson (TV series), a Canadian adventure series
 Radisson Hotel Group, an American multi national hospitality group
 Radisson station, a subway station of the Montreal Metro
 Radisson Substation, an electrical substation near Radisson, Quebec

People with the surname
Pierre-Esprit Radisson (1636–1710), French explorer and fur trader in North America

See also
 CCGS Pierre Radisson, an icebreaker